Sergey Nikolaevich Ivlev (born 29 October 1983) is a badminton player from Russia. He was the Russian National Champions in the men's singles in 2006.

Career 
Ivlev played the 2007 BWF World Championships in men's singles, and was defeated in the first round by Eric Pang, of the Netherlands, 15–21, 6–21. In his home country Russia he won one national title in 2006.

Achievements

European Junior Championships 
Boys' singles

IBF World Grand Prix 
The World Badminton Grand Prix sanctioned by International Badminton Federation (IBF) since 1983.

Mixed doubles

IBF International 
Men's singles

Men's doubles

Mixed doubles

References

External links 
 BWF Player Profile

1983 births
Living people
Russian male badminton players